Jacques Bohée (16 August 1929 – 18 March 1977) was a French football midfielder who was a member of the French squad at the 1952 Summer Olympics.

References

External links
 
 Profile

1929 births
1977 deaths
French footballers
Association football midfielders
CO Roubaix-Tourcoing players
Red Star F.C. players
Olympic footballers of France
Footballers at the 1952 Summer Olympics